Kendall Lamont Ogle (born November 25, 1975) is a former American football linebacker. He played college football at Maryland. He was selected in the 6th round (187th overall) of the 1999 NFL draft by the Cleveland Browns.

Professional career
Ogle was selected in the 6th round (187th overall) of the 1999 NFL draft by the Cleveland Browns, in the inaugural draft class for the returning franchise.

As a rookie, Ogle appeared in two games. On August 27, 2000, he was placed on injured reserve with a hip injury. He was released on September 19, 2000.

References

1975 births
Living people
American football linebackers
Maryland Terrapins football players
Cleveland Browns players
Hillside High School (New Jersey) alumni
Players of American football from New Jersey
People from Hillside, New Jersey
Sportspeople from Union County, New Jersey